Ukba may refer to:
Mar Ukba ben Judah, an exilarch at Baghdad in the first half of the tenth century
Mar Ukba, a Babylonian amora
Ukban ben Nehemiah, a Babylonian amora

UKBA stands for
UK Border Agency, former agency responsible for securing the United Kingdom's borders and controlling migration

See also